Fridtjof Thoen (born 25 September 1961) is a Norwegian judoka. He competed in the men's half-middleweight event at the 1984 Summer Olympics.

References

1961 births
Living people
Norwegian male judoka
Olympic judoka of Norway
Judoka at the 1984 Summer Olympics
Sportspeople from Oslo
20th-century Norwegian people